Software Component Management Object (SCOMO) is an Open Mobile Alliance specification that allows a management authority to perform mobile device management on a remote device, including installation, uninstallation, activation and deactivation of software components over the air. It appears to have been in use between 2008 and 2013.

See also
 Over-the-air programming – firmware update over the air (FOTA), Software Components OTA (SCOTA)

References

External links

Mobile telecommunications standards
Open Mobile Alliance standards